The Moon Is Down is  a novel by American writer John Steinbeck. Fashioned for adaptation for the theatre and for which Steinbeck received the Norwegian King Haakon VII Freedom Cross, it was published by Viking Press in March 1942. The story tells of the military occupation of a small town in Northern Europe by the army of an unnamed nation at war with England and Russia (much like the occupation of Norway by the Germans during World War II).

A French language translation of the book was published illegally in Nazi-occupied France by Les Éditions de Minuit, a French Resistance publishing house. Furthermore, numerous other editions were also secretly published across all of occupied Europe, including Norwegian, Danish, Dutch, and Italian versions (as well as a Swedish version); it was the best known work of U.S. literature in the Soviet Union during the war. Although the text never names the occupying force as German, references to "The Leader", "Memories of defeats in Belgium and France 20 years ago" clearly suggest it. Written with the purpose of motivating resistance movements in occupied countries, the book has appeared in at least 92 editions across the world.

Plot summary 
Taken by surprise, a small coastal town is overrun by an invading army with little resistance. The town is important because it is a port that serves a large coal mine. Colonel Lanser, the head of the invading battalion, along with his staff establishes their headquarters in the house of Orden, the democratically elected and popular mayor.

As the reality of occupation sinks in and the weather turns bleak, with the snows beginning earlier than usual, the "simple, peaceful people" of the town are angry and confused. Colonel Lanser, a veteran of many wars, tries to operate under a veil of civility and law, but in his heart he knows that "there are no peaceful people" amongst those whose freedom has been taken away by force. The calm is soon torn apart when Alexander Morden, an erstwhile alderman and "a free man", is ordered to work in the mine. He strikes out at Captain Loft with a pickaxe, but Captain Bentick steps into its path and dies of it. After a trial, Morden is executed by a firing squad. This incident catalyzes the people of the town and they settle into "a slow, silent, waiting revenge." Sections of the railroad linking the port with the mine get damaged regularly, the machinery breaks down often, and the dynamo of the electricity generators gets short circuited. Whenever a soldier relaxes his guard, drinks or goes out with a woman, he is killed. Mayor Orden stands by his people, and tries to explain to Col. Lanser that his goal – "to break man's spirit permanently" – is impossible.

The cold weather and the constant fear weighs heavy on the occupying force, many of whom wish the war to end so that they can return home. They realize the futility of the war and that "the flies have conquered the flypaper." Some members of the resistance escape to England and ask the English for explosives so that the townspeople can intensify their efforts. English planes parachute-drop small packages containing dynamite sticks and chocolates all around the town. In a state of panic, Colonel Lanser's army takes the mayor and his friend Dr. Winter, the town doctor and historian, hostage and lets it be known that any guerilla action will lead to their execution. Mayor Orden refuses to ask his people to stop active resistance, and feels that nothing can stop his people and that his death is imminent. He tells his wife that while he can be killed, the idea of mayor (and freedom and democracy) is beyond the reach of any army. Before his execution, Mayor Orden reminds Dr. Winter of the dialogues of Socrates in the Apology and Phaedo, a part he played in a high school play, and tells him to make sure that the debt is repaid to the army, i.e., that resistance continues.

Characters

Invaders 
 Colonel Lanser: the head of the occupying force; a World War I veteran.
 Captain Bentick: old, Anglophile; loves dogs, Christmas and "pink children". Is killed by Alex Morden in a fit of rage while trying to protect Captain Loft.
 Major Hunter: the engineer; has a model railroad at home.
 Captain Loft: young, ambitious; he lives and breathes the military.
 Lieutenant Prackle: apparently a good artist; had several blonde sisters.
 Lieutenant Tonder: a poet described as a "dark romantic", is killed by Molly Morden after flirting with her. Dreams of a romantic death in war.
 "the Leader": only referred to and never named; modeled on Adolf Hitler.

Townspeople 
 George Corell: previously popular storekeeper, traitor, and spy. He aids the invaders; modeled on Vidkun Quisling.
 Mayor Orden: a man in his sixties, the long-time mayor of the town. He refuses to tell his people to cooperate with the invaders, knowing that they will not.
 Dr. Winter: the town doctor and an old friend and adviser of the mayor.
 Madame (Sarah): the mayor's wife; often fusses over his appearance.
 Joseph: the mayor's servant; frequently witnesses events in the mayor's house.
 Annie: the mayor's cook; active in the resistance, but not suspected because of her age.
 Alex Morden: kills Captain Bentick in a fit of rage with a pick-axe when he is ordered to work. Meant to attack Captain Loft but Captain Bentick saves Loft. First of the townspeople to be executed. Husband of Molly Morden.
 Molly Morden: his wife; leads on and kills Lt. Tonder after Alex's death.

Adaptations 
Steinbeck adapted The Moon Is Down for the stage in 1942. Directed by Chester Erskine, the original Broadway production opened April 7, 1942, at the Martin Beck Theatre. The cast featured Otto Kruger as Colonel Lanser, Ralph Morgan as Mayor Orden, and Whitford Kane as Dr. Winter. Producer Oscar Serlin announced an earlier-than-anticipated closing, explaining that attendance had "withered under the repeated blasting of those critics who did not like the play." The film rights were sold for $300,000.

King Haakon VII of Norway attended the opening of the London production of The Moon Is Down June 8, 1943, at Whitehall Theatre. The cast included Paul Scofield in the role of Alex Morden.

The Moon Is Down was adapted for a 1943 film directed by Irving Pichel, starring Cedric Hardwicke as Colonel Lanser, Henry Travers as Mayor Orden, and Lee J. Cobb as Dr. Winter.

Title 
The title of the book comes from Macbeth. Just before Banquo encounters Macbeth on his way to kill Duncan, he asks his son, Fleance, "How goes the night, boy?" Fleance replies, "The moon is down; I have not heard the clock." (Act II, Scene i).

References

Further reading
 Ditsky, John. "Steinbeck's 'European' Play-Novella: The Moon Is Down. Steinbeck Quarterly 20.01–02 (Winter/Spring 1987): 9–18.
 French, Warren. The Moon Is Down: John Steinbeck's Times". Steinbeck Quarterly 11.03–04 (Summer/Fall 1978): 77-87.
 Simmonds, Roy S. "Steinbeck and World War II: The Moon Goes Down". Steinbeck Quarterly 17.01–02 (Winter/Spring 1984): 14–34.
 Amelio, Anthony. "Bibliographia Dystopia Volume 1: John Steinbeck's The Moon Is Down. A detailed bibliography of editions and issue points.

External links 

 
 Operation Braddock: A British World War II sabotage and propaganda operation inspired by The Moon Is Down
 New York Times Film Review (1943)

1942 American novels
American novellas
American novels adapted into films
American novels adapted into plays
American war novels
Novels by John Steinbeck
Novels set during World War II
Viking Press books